The Detroit Line is a freight railroad line owned and operated by the Norfolk Southern Railway in the U.S. states of Michigan and Ohio.

Description
The line begins south of Gibraltar Road in Gibraltar, Michigan, south of Detroit, Michigan, and runs southwest to Toledo, Ohio, and consists of two separate and parallel tracks. Track #1 is the southbound track originally owned by the Lake Shore & Michigan Southern Railway.  Track #2 is the northbound track originally owned by Michigan Central Railroad. Track #2 is paralleled directly to its east by the CN/GTW Shore Line Subdivision from the start of the line at Gibraltar Road to Vienna Junction just north of the Michigan–Ohio state line. Track #1 lies to the west of Track #2 where it runs from adjacent or 1/2 mile apart. At the lines northern end it becomes the line of the same name for the Conrail Shared Assets Operations; its south end is at the Chicago Line at Air Line Junction in western Toledo.

History
The Detroit, Monroe and Toledo Railroad opened a line from Detroit to Toledo in 1856. The Toledo, Canada Southern and Detroit Railway opened a parallel line, just to the east, in 1873. With the 1930 lease of the Michigan Central Railroad by the New York Central Railroad, both lines were placed under NYC operation. The lines passed to Conrail, and were assigned to Norfolk Southern in Conrail's 1999 breakup; they are now used through a directional running setup, in which southbound trains use the old DM&T and northbound trains use the old TCS&D.

References

Norfolk Southern Railway lines
Michigan Central Railroad lines
Lake Shore and Michigan Southern Railway lines
Rail infrastructure in Michigan
Rail infrastructure in Ohio